In Cuba, a popular dance known as Casino was marketed abroad as Cuban-style salsa or Salsa Cubana to distinguish it from other salsa styles when the name was popularized in the 1970s. Dancing Casino is an expression of popular social culture in Cuba and many Cubans consider casino a part of their social and cultural activities centering on their popular music.

The origins of the name Casino are casinos deportivos, the dance halls where a lot of social dancing was done among the better off, white Cubans during the mid-1950s and onward.

Historically, Casino traces its origin as a partner dance from Son Cubano, fused with partner figures and turns adopted from the Cuban Mambo, Cuban Cha Cha Cha, Rumba Guaguancó and North American Jive. As with Son, Danzón and Cha Cha Cha, it is traditionally, though less often today, danced a contratiempo. This means that, distinct from subsequent forms of salsa, no step is taken on the first and fifth beats in each clave pattern and the fourth and eighth beat are emphasised. In this way, rather than following a beat, the dancers themselves contribute in their movement, to the polyrythmic pattern of the music.

Casino dance is often intertwined with Afro-Cuban dance traditions, which many dancers spontaneously draw from in a more or less structured or ad hoc fashion, though this is not per se definitory of the dance itself. In the same way that a sonero (lead singer in Son and Salsa bands) may "quote" other, older songs in their own, a Casino dancer frequently improvises references to other dances, integrating movements, gestures and extended passages from the folkloric and popular heritage. This is particularly true of African descended Cubans. Such improvisations might include extracts of rumba, dances for African deities, the older popular dances such as Cha Cha Cha and Danzón.

Culture and geography
Culturally, Casino is danced as an interplay between genders and feeling the music (Sabor) as its main ingredients.  Much of the interplay of Casino style dancing is based on the broader Afro-Caribbean cultural context with emphasis on sexual interplay, teasing and everyday experience.

Geographically, in Latin America, Casino and its variants are danced in Cuba, the Dominican Republic, and Venezuela. It is also popular in Europe and parts of Asia.

Styles of casino

As a partner dance (Parejas)
Casino is danced in three points which makes up a circular motion as partners face each other in intricate patterns of arms and body movement. This is distinctive from the North American Salsa styles which is danced in a slot (two points) and linear positions as taught by the North American and European dance studios.

Casino has a number of basic steps. One of them known as guapea ("swagger") or pausa, among other attested names, involves the leader lead performing a more or less pronounced dragging of his left foot backwards from a slightly advanced onset position. This is in stark contrast to the most common basic Salsa step, in which the lead steps forward with his left foot.

Casino styling includes men being "macho" and women being femininely sexy, with major body and muscle isolations, through the influence of Rumba dancing. During the dance, dancers often break from each other during percussion solos and perform the despelote, an advanced form of styling in which the male and female partner get physically close and tease each other without touching through the gyrating of hips and shoulders while performing muscle isolations.

The major distinction of Casino Styling is that male partners have tendencies to show off (following Afro-Cuban Guaguancó influence), under the cultural guise of males having to attract attention and tease females. This is the major point of differences between Casino and Northern American forms of Salsa, which ascribe to the ballroom adage of "men are the picture frame while women are the picture."

As a solo dance (Suelta)
Suelto, dancing salsa without a partner, originates from stage singers and dancers, who perform dance routines during orchestra and live performances. Dancing alone or in a group (usually with a male facing females on the dance floor), the movements are based on a-tiempo or contra-tiempo, with intricate footwork and lively body movements.

Other forms of partner dancing
Other partner dancing styles include Trios or Quattros, in which a lead dances with two or more partners in intricate patterns. There is also a Trios version in which two leads share a follow. 
Additionally, several couples can come together to dance choreographed moves with changes of partners, led by a caller and known as "rueda de casino". This last form is popular everywhere there is Cuban music. In the United States, many dance schools only offer rueda de casino and ignore completely the dance of casino. These schools often mistakenly identify the dance as  "casino rueda" or "salsa rueda", both incorrect terms.

See also 
 Rueda de Casino - a lively group formation of dancing casino 
 Salsa (dance)

References

External links 
 Sonycasino - A well-researched blog on Cuban dance and music by Cuba-born Daybert Linares.
 Salsayo - a dictionary of Cuban Salsa moves

Salsa